Euryplacidae is a family of crabs in the superfamily Goneplacoidea which consists of 14 existing genera and 31 existing species and 8 fossil genera and 15 fossil species.

Genera
There are 14 currently recognised extant genera in the family Euryplacidae:

 Eucrate De Haan, 1835
 Euryplax Stimpson, 1859
 Frevillea A. Milne-Edwards, 1880
 Henicoplax Castro & Ng, 2010
 Heteroplax Stimpson, 1858
 Machaerus Leach, 1818 
 Nancyplax Lemaitre, García-Gómez, von Sternberg & Campos, 2001 
 Platyozius Borradaile, 1902
 Psopheticoides Sakai, 1969
 Systroplax Castro & Ng, 2010
 Trissoplax Castro & Ng, 2010
 Trizocarcinus Rathbun, 1914 
 Villoplax Castro & Ng, 2010
 Xenocrate Ng & Castro, 2007
 †Chirinocarcinus Karasawa & Schweitzer, 2004
 †Chlinocephalus Ristori, 1886
 †Corallicarcinus Müller & Collins, 1991
 †Orbitoplax Tucker & Feldmann, 1990
 †Palaeopsopheticus Hu & Tao, 1996
 †Simonellia Vinassa de Regny, 1897
 †Stoaplax Vega, Cosma, Coutiño, Feldmann, Nyborg, Schweitzer & Waugh, 2001
†Viaplax'' Karasawa & Kato, 2003
† = Extinct

References

Decapods
Decapod families